Hamza Yusuf (born Mark Hanson; 1958) is an American Islamic neo-traditionalist, Islamic scholar, and co-founder of Zaytuna College. He is a proponent of classical learning in Islam and has promoted Islamic sciences and classical teaching methodologies throughout the world.

He is an advisor to both the Center for Islamic Studies at the Graduate Theological Union in Berkeley and the Islamic Studies programme at Stanford University. In addition, he serves as vice-president for the Global Center for Guidance and Renewal, which was founded and is currently presided over by Abdallah bin Bayyah. He also serves as vice-president of the UAE-based Forum for Promoting Peace in Muslim Societies, where Abdallah bin Bayyah also serves as president. The Forum has attracted huge controversy for its close ties to the UAE dictatorship aswell as Hamza Yusuf's personal support for authoritarian leaders.

The Guardian has referred to Yusuf as "arguably the West's most influential Islamic scholar". The New Yorker magazine also called him "perhaps the most influential Islamic scholar in the Western world", and journalist Graeme Wood has called him "one the two most prominent Muslim scholars in the United States today". He is one of the signatories of A Common Word Between Us and You, an open letter by Islamic scholars to Christian leaders calling for peace and understanding. Yusuf was also one of the signatories of an open letter to former ISIS leader Abu Bakr al-Baghdadi that sought to refute the principles promoted by the terrorist organization.

He has been listed in the top 50 of The 500 Most Influential Muslims (also known as The Muslim 500), an annual publication compiled by the Royal Islamic Strategic Studies Centre in Amman, Jordan, which ranks the most influential Muslims in the world. He has nevertheless been widely criticised for his views on race, politics, and the Arab revolutions.

Early life and education
Yusuf was born as Mark Hanson in Walla Walla, Washington to two academics working at Whitman College and he was raised in northern California. He grew up as a practicing Irish Catholic Christian and attended prep schools on both the East and West coasts. In 1977, after a near-death experience in a car accident and reading the Qur'an, he converted to Islam. Yusuf has Irish, Scottish and Greek ancestry.

After being impressed by a young couple from Saudi Arabia who were followers of Abdalqadir as-Sufi—a Scottish convert to Islam and leader of the Darqawa Sufi order and the Murabitun World Movement—Yusuf moved to Norwich, England to study directly under as-Sufi. In 1979, Yusuf moved to Al Ain in the United Arab Emirates where he spent the next four years studying Sharia sciences at the Islamic Studies Institute of the United Arab Emirates University, more often on a one-on-one basis with Islamic scholars. Yusuf became fluent in the Arabic language and also learned Qur'anic recitation (tajwid), rhetoric, poetry, law (fiqha) and theology (aqidah) among other classical Islamic disciplines.

In 1984, Yusuf formally disassociated himself from as-Sufi's teachings and moved in a different intellectual direction having been influenced by a number of Mauritanian scholars residing in the Emirates. He moved to North Africa in 1984 studying in Algeria and Morocco, as well as Spain and Mauritania. In Mauritania he developed his most lasting and powerful relationship with Islamic scholar Sidi Muhammad Ould Fahfu al-Massumi, known as Murabit al-Hajj.

In 2020, Yusuf completed his Ph.D. at the Graduate Theological Union. His dissertation was titled, "The Normative Islamic Tradition in North and West Africa: A Case Study of Transmission of Authority and Distillation of Knowledge in Ibn Ashir’s Al-Murshid al-Mu’in (The Helpful Guide)." Yusuf previously earned an associate degree in nursing from Imperial Valley College and a bachelor's degree in religious studies from San José State University.

Career

Zaytuna College
He and other colleagues founded the Zaytuna Institute in Berkeley, California, United States, in 1996, dedicated to the revival of traditional study methods and the sciences of Islam. He was joined by Zaid Shakir and Hatem Bazian in establishing what was then Zaytuna Institute. In the fall of 2010 it opened its doors as Zaytuna College, a four-year Muslim liberal arts college, the first of its kind in the United States. It incorporates Yusuf's vision of combining the classical liberal arts—based in the trivium and quadrivium—with rigorous training in traditional Islamic disciplines. It aims to "educate and prepare morally committed professional, intellectual, and spiritual leaders". Zaytuna College became the first accredited Muslim campus in the United States after it received approval from the Western Association of Schools and Colleges. Yusuf stated that "We hope, God willing, that there will be more such Muslim colleges and universities to come".

Hamza Yusuf has been involved in controversies in recent years on issues of race, politics, and the Arab revolutions.

2016 Black Lives Matter comments 
In December 2016, Yusuf made comments that were perceived as critical of the tactics employed by the Black Lives Matter movement. Yusuf claimed there were more endemic issues facing the black community within, such as the breakdown of family. He also raised concerns about racist sentiments in the Muslim community, where the condemnation of 'white privilege' is fierce, but silent on 'Arab privilege', citing the treatment of Pakistanis and Indians in some parts of the Arab world. For these comments he was attacked on social media, but many scholars defended Shaykh Yusuf, such as Imam Zaid Shakir who stated, "I can say with absolute confidence that there is not a racist bone in Shaykh Hamza’s body. A racist is someone who believes in the superiority of one race over another. Shaykh Hamza, like any serious Muslim, totally rejects that idea."

Interfaith  
Yusuf participates in the Forum for Promoting Peace in Muslim Societies hosted by the UAE. He praised the UAE for its increasing tolerance and its adoption of multi-faith initiatives and plans to build a multi-faith centre in Abu Dhabi.

Comments on the Syrian Revolution 
In 2019, Yusuf urged patience and caution in relation to the Syrian crisis. Although some viewed these comments as supportive of the Syrian regime, this has been unequivocally rejected by Yusuf, who made a statement of response. Yusuf translated a poem titled the 'Prayer of the Oppressed' in 2010, dedicated to all the oppressed peoples around the world.

Alleged support for Dictatorships 
Hamza Yusuf has also been accused of normalising and legitimatising dictatorships across the Middle East since the Arab Spring protests. Yusuf has also criticised and compared the political goals of Islamists to Marxists.

According to Dr Usaama Al Azimi of Oxford University: 

"For Shaykh Hamza, the fault here appears to lie with the peaceful protestors for provoking these governments to crush them. Such a conception of the dynamics of protest appears to assume that the autocratic governmental response to this is a natural law akin to cause and effect. The logic would seem to be: if one peacefully calls for reform and one is murdered in cold blood by a tyrannical government, then one has only oneself to blame. 

Shaykh Hamza Yusuf appears to be willing to defend autocracy no matter what they do on the grounds that government, in principle, is what is at stake. Indeed, in defending government as necessary and a blessing, he rhetorically challenges his critics to “ask the people of Libya whether government is a blessing; ask the people of Yemen whether government is a blessing; ask the people of Syria whether government is a blessing?” The tragic irony of such statements is that these countries have, in part, been destroyed because of the interventions of a government, one for which Shaykh Hamza serves as an official, namely the UAE."

Views and influence
Yusuf has taken a stance against religious justifications for terrorist attacks. He described the 9/11 attacks as "an act of mass murder, pure and simple". Condemning the attacks, he also stated that "Islam was hijacked ... on that plane as an innocent victim."

Jordan's Royal Islamic Strategic Studies Centre currently places him 36th on its list of the top 500 most influential Muslims in the world. In its 2016 edition, Yusuf is described "as one of the foremost authorities on Islam outside of the Muslim world" by The 500 Most Influential Muslims, edited by John Esposito and Ibrahim Kalin.

Publications

See also
Shaykh Abdullah Bin Bayyah
Sheikh Abubakr Ahmad
Imam Zaid Shakir

References

External links

 

 

 Hamza Yusuf Audio Lectures

1960 births
Living people
American people of Greek descent
American Muslims
American Sunni Muslims
American people of Irish descent
American people of Scottish descent
American expatriates in the United Arab Emirates
21st-century Muslim scholars of Islam
American Sunni Muslim scholars of Islam
Muslim apologists
Muslim reformers
American former Christians
Former Greek Orthodox Christians
Converts to Islam from Eastern Orthodoxy
Converts to Sunni Islam from Christianity
Maliki fiqh scholars
Writers from the San Francisco Bay Area
People from Hayward, California
People from Walla Walla, Washington
San Jose State University alumni
American Sufis